Ronnie may refer to:

Ronnie (name), a unisex pet name and given name
"Ronnie" (Four Seasons song), a song by Bob Gaudio and Bob Crewe
"Ronnie" (Metallica song), a song from the Metallica album Load
Ronnie Brunswijkstadion, an association football stadium located in Moengo, Suriname

See also

 Ronny (given name)
 Veronica (disambiguation)
 Ronald (disambiguation)
 Ron (disambiguation)